Alexander Iacovitti (born 2 September 1997) is a professional footballer who plays as a defender for Scottish Premiership club Ross County.

Club career

Nottingham Forest
Born to an Italian father and a Scottish mother, Iacovitti progressed through the academy of Nottingham Forest and made his professional debut for the club on 6 August 2016, starting at left-back in a 4–3 win against Burton Albion. On 31 August 2016 Iacovitti joined Mansfield Town on loan for the 2016–17 season.

Stags manager Adam Murray revealed that there had been a lot of interest from other clubs in Iacovitti, and described the player as an "old-school centre-half". On 12 November, Iacovitti was shown a red card in the 74th minute away at Portsmouth. A goal down at the time, Mansfield Town went on to lose the game 4–0 having also had Kyle Howkins dismissed. On 1 January 2017, Mansfield Town confirmed that Iacovitti would be returning to Forest early from his loan spell. Mansfield manager Steve Evans, who had replaced Murray in November, cited the reason as a lack of playing time.

On 31 July 2017, Iacovitti was loaned to League Two club Forest Green Rovers for the 2017–18 season. However, his loan was cut short at the beginning of 2018 and he returned to Nottingham.

On 28 January 2019, Iacovitti joined League Two side Oldham Athletic on loan for the remainder of the season.

Iacovitti was released by Forest at the end of their 2018–19 season.

Oldham Athletic 
On 21 May 2019, Iacovitti re-joined League Two side Oldham Athletic permanently on a two-year deal.

Ross County 
On 26 June 2020, Iacovitti joined Ross County on a permanent contract.

Career statistics

References

External links

1997 births
Living people
Footballers from Nottingham
Scottish footballers
Scotland under-21 international footballers
Scotland youth international footballers
English footballers
English people of Scottish descent
English people of Italian descent
English Football League players
Nottingham Forest F.C. players
Mansfield Town F.C. players
Forest Green Rovers F.C. players
Oldham Athletic A.F.C. players
Ross County F.C. players
Association football defenders
Scottish Professional Football League players